Beyond the Front Line is a 2004 Finnish war film directed by Åke Lindman. The film is based on the diaries of Swedish-speaking Finnish soldiers who served in the Continuation War in 1942–1944.

Cast 
 Tobias Zilliacus as Harry Järv
 Ilkka Heiskanen as Alpo Marttinen
 Christoffer Westerlund as Allan Finholm
 Kim Gustafsson as Björk
 Martin Bahne as Lindblad
 Carl-Gustaf Wentzel as Forss
 Jan-Christian Söderholm as Helén
 Sampo Sarkola as Kaustinen
 Johan Rönneholm as Händig
 Joachim Thibblin as Söderman
 Oskar Silén as Mattas
 Paavo Kerosuo as Bror Östman
 Patrick Henriksen as Rosenlöf
 Peter Kanerva as Olof Fagerström
 Jan Korander as Löfman
 Asko Sarkola as Marshal Mannerheim

References

External links 
 Official website in Finnish or Swedish
 

Continuation War
Films directed by Åke Lindman
Films set in Finland
Films shot in Finland
2000s Finnish-language films
2000s Swedish-language films
Swedish-language films from Finland
World War II films based on actual events
2000s war films
Finnish World War II films
2004 multilingual films
Finnish multilingual films